Caryatis stenoperas is a moth of the subfamily Arctiinae. It was described by George Hampson in 1910. It is found in the Democratic Republic of the Congo and Uganda.

References

Moths described in 1910
Nyctemerina
Insects of the Democratic Republic of the Congo
Insects of Uganda
Moths of Africa